Kim Seon-dong may refer to:

Kim Seon-dong (politician, born 1963)
Kim Seon-dong (politician, born 1967)